Rosenbergia chaminadei is a species of beetle in the family Cerambycidae. It was described by Rigout in 2004.

References

Batocerini
Beetles described in 2004